This list comprises all players who have participated in at least one match for Rochester Rhinos (formerly the Raging Rhinos) or the current incarnation, RNY FC.  RNY FC is the same club as the Rochester Rhinos, but rebranded, and still use the Rhinos name, so players are credited on the all time list.

These matches could have been regular season, playoffs, US Open Cup, or the 2001 US Open Cup qualifiers.  This list is currently complete for outfield players who have played at least 5 minutes, but not for goalkeepers.

A "†" denotes players who only appeared in a single match.

A
  Carlos Aguilar
  Roland Vargas-Aguilera
  Jacob Akanyirige
 Ezikeil Alamo 
  Frank Alesci 
  Howard Allen †
  Yari Allnutt
  Chris Aloisi
  Hamisi Amani-Dove 
  Mike Ambersley
  Bill Andracki
  Dan Annan 
  Daniel Antunez
  Vasilios Apostolopoulos 
  Tim Ashe 
  Taiwo Atieno

B
  Chris Bagley
  Gaoussou Bakayoko
  John Ball
  Jamal Ballantyne 
  Kalin Bankov 
  J.C. Banks
  Lamar Batista
  Jesus Batiz
  Jordan Becker
  Tyler Bellamy
  Ian Bennett
  Brandon Beresford
  Kenney Bertz
  Mauro Biello 
  Alex Blake †
  Jonathan Bolaños
  Josh Bolton
  Tenywa Bonseu
  Nathan Bourdeau
  Rayane Boukemia
  Blake Brettschneider
  Dante Brigida
  Graciano Brito
  Mike Britton 
  Jalen Brown
  Warner Brown
  Kevin Burns
  Julian Engels né Büscher
  Steve Butcher

C
  Caíque (footballer, born 1997)
  Sergio Campbell
  Mauro Carabajal
  Chris Carrieri
  David Atiba Charles
  Connor Chinn
  Frederick Commodore
  Antonio Correia (Cape Verde footballer)
  Drew Cost
  Gabriel Costa
  Rich Costanzo
  Nate Craft
  Mario Cristofori†

D
  Nate Daligcon 
  Jefferson Dargout
  Edivaldo Sarafim-DaSilva
  Mauro DaSilva 
  Fuseini Dauda 
  Kofi Debrah 
  Stefan Defregger
  Noah Delgado 
  Matthew Delicâte
  Craig Demmin
  Babacar Diallo
  Hamed Diallo
  Kirk Dietrich 
  Ryan Dinunzio 
  Alex Dixon
  Bubacar Djalo
  Pedro Dolabella
  Neil Dombrowski
  Mike Domm
  Tony Donatelli
  Steevan Dos Santos
  Jordan Dover
  Bilal Duckett

E
  Danny Earls
  Samuel Edoung-Biyo
  Connally Edozien
  Opi Edwards
  Pat Ercoli †
  Chris Estridge

F
  Josh Faga
  Wal Fall
  Joe Farrell (soccer)
  Ryan Felix
  Max Ferdinand
  Lucas Fernández (footballer, born 1988)
  Bradley Kamdem Fewo
  Ryan Firestone†
  Leslie Fitzpatrick
  Carl Fletcher 
  Kenardo Forbes
  Andre Fortune
  Christiano Francois
  Jamie Franks
  Josh Freeman
  Ian Fuller

G
  Michael Gamble (soccer) †
  Ian Garrett
  Mike Garzi
  Charles Gbeke
  Gabriel Gervais 
  Neathan Gibson 
  Jimmy Glenn 
  Tomas Gomez
  T. J. Gore
  Jochen Graf
  Jonathan Greenfield
  Andrew Gregor
  Michel Guilavogui
  Steve Guppy
  Henry Gutierrez

H
  Anthony Hamilton
  Patrick Hannigan
  Ty Harden †
  Tim Hardy 
  Chase Harrison
  David Hayes
  Ryan Heins
  Masaki Hemmi
  Dan Hetrick †
  Kyle Hoffer
  Jamie Holmes
  Carl Hopfinger 
  Matt Horth
  Levi Houapeu
  Nate Houser 
  Greg Howes
  Andrew Hoxie
  Dusty Hudock

I
  Will Inalien
  Ernest Inneh †

J
  Kendall Jagdeosingh
  Ryan James (soccer)
  Soren Johnson

K
  Nate Kaczanowski
  Zoran Karic 
  Danny Kelly 
  Chris Kennell 
  Darren Kenton
  Steve Kindel
  Isaac Kissi
  Mike Kirmse 
  Quavas Kirk
  Mike Kirmse 
  Nasho Kirov 
  Isaac Kissi
  Neal Kitson
  Brayton Knapp †
  Kevin Koetters 
  Aleksey Korol 
  Nate Kraft
  Danny Kramer
  Luke Kreamalmeyer
  Georgios Kyriazis

L	
  Ross LaBauex
  Gabe Latigue
  Yuri Lavrinenko
  Raymond Lee (soccer)
  Ricky Lewis
  Daniel Lind
  Aaran Lines
  Alfonso Loera
  Gerardo Lopez (soccer)
  Andy Lorei
  Onandi Lowe 
  Matt Luzunaris

M
  Darius Madison
  Kyle Manscuk
  Alen Marcina
  Hector Marinaro 
  Novica Marojevic 
  Nigel Marples †
  Yohance Marshall
  Rey Ángel Martínez
  Jordan Mccrary 
  Brendon McDermott†
  Errol McFarlane 
  Kevyn McFarlane
  Kendell McFayden
  Yogi McKay 
  Patrick McMahon
  Tam McManus
  Tim Melia
  Carlos Mendes
  Johnny Mendoza
  Johnny Menyongar
  Joe Mercik 
  Brandon Miller
  Doug Miller
  George Miller
  Scott Miller †
  Evan Milward
  Leon Minnott 
  Jamel Mitchell
  Stoian Mladenov
  Darci Montiero
  Alfonso Motagalvan
  Pat Mulcahy
  Timi Mulgrew

N
  Martin Nash 
  Adauto Neto
  Kristian Nicht
  Kevin Novak
  Amaury Nunes

O
  Onua Obasi
  Brandon (Karo) Okiomah
  Pierre Omanga
  Pat Onstad

P
  Viktor Paco
  Scott Palguta
  Carlos Parra 
  Jason Perry
  Samuel Petrone
  Mayard Pierre-Rudolph
  Ian Pilarski
  Aaron Pitchkolan
  Tyler Polak
  Preston Popp
  Todd Pratzner

R
  Gibran Rayo
  Mike Reidy
  Sean Reilly
  Andrew Restrepo 
  JP Reyes
  Julian Ringhof
  Gustavo Rissi
  Rene Rivas
  Marco Rizi
  Ze Roberto
  Troy Roberts
  Maurizio Rocha
  Colin Rolfe
  Gustavo Romanello
  Tyler Rosenlund
  Anthony Rougier
  Lance Rozeboom
  Tyler Rudy
  Kevin Rueda †
  Drew Ruggles

S
  Mauricio Salles
  Dominic Samuel
  Asani Samuels
  Jossimar Sanchez
  Brent Sancho
  Frank Sanfilippo
  Nuno Santos
  Kwame Sarkodie
  P.J. Scheufele
  Scott Schweitzer
  Eduardo Sebrango 
  Bill Sedgewick
  Leigh Sembaluk
  Carlos Semedo
  Chad Severs
  Stephen Shirley-Black
  Nathaniel Short
  Christian Silva
  Greg Simmonds 
  Patrick Slogic
  Davis Smith
  Donnie Smith
  John Smith †
  Michael Smith
  Rob Smith 
  Ross Smith
  Yuriy Smotrych 
  Paulo Soares
  Ayao Sossou
  Darren Spicer
  Dan Stebbins 
  Jonny Steele
  Lenin Steenkamp
  Brad Stisser
  Justin Stoddart
  Dmitri Stoyanov 
  Darrell Stuart
  Temoc Suarez
  Alec Sundly

T
  Michael Tanke 
  Jimmy Tanner 
  Tommy Tanner 
  Kevin Taylor
  Sofiane Tergou 
  Andy Tiedt †
  Darren Tilley
  Connor Tobin 
  Ken Tometsko †
  George Tor 
  Sean Totsch 
  Mike Tranchilla 
  Jack Traynor 
  Will Traynor 
  Mickey Trotman 
  Ryan Trout
  Shaun Tsakiris
  Mychal Turpin

U
  Marcos Ugarte
  Warren Ukah

V
  Gabriel Valencia-Jimenez
  Scott Vallow
  Grant Van De Casteele
  Milan Vanacker
  Tim Velten
  Kénold Versailles
  Nikola Vignjevic 
  Gustavo Villagra 
  Walter Villagra†
  Christian Volesky
  Minh Vu
  Bo Vuckovic

W
  Tony Walls
  Mali Walton
  Adam West
  Ryan Wileman
  Ed Williams
  John Wilson
  Kirk Wilson
  John Wolyniec
  Christian Wood
  Corey Woolfolk
  David Wright
  Tom Wurdack

Y
  Paul Young

Z
  Theo Zagar
  Mike Zaher
  Gustavo Zamudio
  Carlos Zavala

Sources

Rochester Rhinos
 
Association football player non-biographical articles